Hongcheng Lake is a lake in Haikou, Hainan, China. It was renovated around 2017 to 2018. It has three islands. Two small, and one, at the west side, is larger with short bridge access and an old, dilapidated building on it.

References

External links
 

Tourist attractions in Haikou
Lakes of China